The 594th Boat and Shore Regiment was a military engineer unit in the United States Army. The regiment served during World War II and was also known as the 594th Engineer Amphibian Regiment.

History
The 594th Boat and Shore Regiment was activated as the 594th Engineer Amphibian Regiment at Fort Devens, Massachusetts on 1 February 1943, as part of the 4th Engineer Special Brigade.

References

594th Eng Boat & Shore Regt at www.armyamphibs.com (archive link)

594
Military units and formations established in 1943
Military units and formations disestablished in 1946
1943 establishments in Massachusetts
1946 disestablishments in the United States